The River Medway in England flows for  from Turners Hill, in West Sussex, through Tonbridge, Maidstone and the Medway Towns conurbation in Kent, to the River Thames at Sheerness, where it shares the latter's estuary. The Medway Navigation runs from the Leigh Barrier south of Tonbridge to Allington just north of Maidstone. The Environment Agency is the navigation authority responsible for the navigation.

The route
Until 1746 the river was impassable above Maidstone. To that point each village on the river had its wharf or wharves: at Halling, Snodland, New Hythe and Aylesford. Cargoes included corn, fodder, fruit, stone and timber.

In 1746 improvements to the channel meant that barges of  could reach East Farleigh, Yalding and even Tonbridge. The channel was further improved to Leigh in 1828. There are eleven locks on the river. The lowest, opened in 1792, is at Allington, and is the extent of tides. The others are East Farleigh, Teston, Hampstead Lane, Stoneham Old Lock (disused), Sluice Weir Lock, Oak Wier Lock East Lock, Porter's, Eldridge's and Town Lock in Tonbridge (see table). The shallowest point is just below Sluice Weir Lock which is prone to silting after heavy rain. The draughts along the navigation are: Tonbridge to Yalding 4 feet; Yalding to Maidstone 5 feet 6 inches; Maidstone to Allington Lock 6 feet 6 inches. Headroom is 8 feet 6 inches below Tonbridge. College Lock, in Maidstone, was removed in 1899. Stoneham Old Lock was dismantled in 1915 as part of a reconstruction of that section of the waterway.

The locks on the navigation are as follows.

See also

Canals of the United Kingdom
History of the British canal system
River Medway

References

Transport in Medway
River navigations in the United Kingdom